Monte Escobedo Municipality is a municipality located in the southwestern area of the Mexican state of Zacatecas. With a total population of 8,929 people, that municipality was given in 1820, when the Cortes of Cádiz in Spain was established.

The Township was named as Francisco de Escobedo y Díaz, an early settler of the town.

The last police officer of Monte Escobedo disappeared on January 19, 2021. Two police officers resigned in December 2020; in 2013 there were 22 officers. The municipality is now completely controlled by the Jalisco New Generation Cartel (CJNG).

References

 https://www.facebook.com/profile.php?id=100007722336911
 https://www.facebook.com/monteescobedensesusa.monteescobedo/

Municipalities of Zacatecas
Populated places in Zacatecas